Extranjero was a 1990 album by Franco De Vita released on the CBS Records label. The CD produced three singles, most notably the critically acclaimed "No Basta," which spent four weeks at No. 1 on the Billboard Latin music charts in the United States. Other singles from the album included "Ya Lo He Vivido" and "Será."

Track listing 
All the songs written and composed by Franco De Vita.

1990 albums
Franco De Vita albums